The Hold-Up is a 2001 Spanish heist comedy film directed by  from a screenplay by  which stars Adriana Ozores, Malena Alterio, Maribel Verdú, and Carmen Maura.

Plot 
The plot follows an attempt of bank heist pulled by four women (including a cleaner working in the target bank, a pregnant hairdresser, and a street urchin).

Cast

Production 
The film, Eva Lesmes' sophomore feature, was produced by Bocaboca in association with Telecinco.

Release 
Distributed by Columbia TriStar, the film was theatrically released in Spain on 4 May 2001.

Reception 
Jonathan Holland of Variety deemed the film to be an "engaging femme comedy built around an unlikely bank heist" confirming helmer's talent for comedy.

Accolades 

|-
| align = "center" | 2002 || 16th Goya Awards || Best New Actress || Malena Alterio ||  || 
|}

See also 
 List of Spanish films of 2001

References 

BocaBoca Producciones films
Spanish heist films
2000s Spanish films
2000s Spanish-language films
Spanish comedy films
2001 comedy films
2000s heist films